This article lists the colonial governors of the former French Dahomey (1904–1958) in French West Africa, the present day nation of Benin.

List

(Dates in italics indicate de facto continuation of office)

See also
For continuation after 1958 independence, see: List of presidents of Benin
Kingdom of Dahomey (1600−1904)
French Dahomey (1904−1958)
Republic of Dahomey (1958–1975)
People's Republic of Benin (1975–1990)
Benin (1990−present)

References
 Rulers.org: Benin
  Geocities.com: Ivory Coast
  Rezoweb.com: Congo diaspora
 African States and Rulers, John Stewart, McFarland.
 Heads of State and Government, 2nd Edition, John V da Graca, MacMillan Press, 2000.

French Dahomey
Dahomey
French Dahomey
Benin history-related lists